Sangni Fort also known as Sangani Killa is a fort of Sikh Period near the village Takal in Kallar Syedan Tehsil, Rawalpindi District, in Punjab, Pakistan.

History

The fort was built in the Sikh Period (1799–1849). This area came under Sandhawalia Jat ruler Maharaja Ranjit Singh in 1814. It was built to control the area and to facilitate tax collection. The British made this area part of Bewal. Gradually the fort lost its importance and became obscure. The keepers of a nearby obscure shrine moved the shrine to this fort.

The fort is in good condition with intact walls but the inside is altered and decorated due to the presence of the shrine of Sahibzada Abdul Hakeem.

References

Further reading 
 Pre-historic site discovered in Kallar Syedan

Forts in Punjab, Pakistan
Kallar Syedan Tehsil